A griot (Manding: jali or jeli (in N'Ko: , djeli or djéli in French spelling); Serer: kevel or kewel / okawul; Wolof: gewel) is a West African historian, storyteller, praise singer, poet, and/or musician.

The griot is a repository of oral tradition and is often seen as a leader due to their position as an advisor to royal personages. As a result of the former of these two functions, they are sometimes called bards. They also act as mediators in disputes.

Occurrence and naming 
Many griots today live in many parts of West Africa and are present among the Mande peoples (Mandinka or Malinké, Bambara, Soninke etc.), Fulɓe (Fula), Hausa, Songhai, Tukulóor, Wolof, Serer, Mossi, Dagomba, Mauritanian Arabs, and many other smaller groups. There are other griots who have left their home country for another such as the United States or France and still maintain their role as griots. 

The word may derive from the French transliteration "guiriot" of the Portuguese word "criado", or the masculine singular term for "servant." Griots are more predominant in the northern portions of West Africa.

In African languages, griots are referred to by a number of names:  jèli in northern Mande areas, jali in southern Mande areas, guewel in Wolof, kevel or kewel or okawul in Serer, gawlo  in Pulaar (Fula), iggawen in Hassaniyan, arokin in Yoruba, and diari or gesere in Soninke.

Terms: "griot" and "jali"
The Manding term  jeliya (meaning "musicianhood") sometimes refers to the knowledge of griots, indicating the hereditary nature of the class. Jali comes from the root word  jali or djali (blood). This is also the title given to griots in regions within the former Mali Empire. Though the term "griot" is more common in English, some, such as poet Bakari Sumano, prefer the term jeli.

Role
Griots are an ethnic group, which have the main responsibility for keeping stories of the individual tribes and families alive in the oral tradition, with the narrative accompanied by a musical instrument. They are an essential part of many West African events such as weddings where they sing and share family history of the bride and groom. It is also their role to settle disputes and act as  mediator in case of conflicts. Respect for and familiarity with the Griot meant that they could approach both parties without being attacked, and initiate peace negotiations between the hostile parties.

Griots form an endogamous caste, meaning that most of them only marry fellow griots and those who are not griots do not typically perform the same functions that griots perform.

Francis Bebey writes about the griot in African Music, A People's Art:

"The West African griot is a troubadour, the counterpart of the medieval European minstrel... The griot knows everything that is going on... He is a living archive of the people's traditions... The virtuoso talents of the griots command universal admiration. This virtuosity is the culmination of long years of study and hard work under the tuition of a teacher who is often a father or uncle. The profession is by no means a male prerogative. There are many women griots whose talents as singers and musicians are equally remarkable."

In the Mali Empire

The Mali Empire (Malinke Empire), at its height in the middle of the 14th century, extended from central Africa (today's Chad and Niger) to West Africa (today's Mali and Senegal). The empire was founded by Sundiata Keita, whose exploits remain celebrated in Mali today. In the Epic of Sundiata, Naré Maghann Konaté offered his son Sundiata Keita a griot, Balla Fasséké, to advise him in his reign. Balla Fasséké is considered the founder of the Kouyaté line of griots that exists to this day.

Each aristocratic family of griots accompanied a higher-ranked family of warrior-kings or emperors, called jatigi. In traditional culture, no griot can be without a jatigi, and no jatigi can be without a griot. However, the jatigi can loan his griot to another jatigi.

Most villages also had their own griot, who told tales of births, deaths, marriages, battles, hunts, affairs, and other life events.

In Mande society
In many Mande societies, the jeli was a historian, advisor, arbitrator, praise singer (patronage), and storyteller. They essentially served as history books, preserving ancient stories and traditions through song. Their tradition was passed down through generations. The name jeli means "blood" in Manika language. They were believed to have deep connections to spiritual, social, or political powers. Speech was believed to have power in its capacity to recreate history and relationships.

Despite the authority of griots and the perceived power of their songs, griots are not treated as positively in West Africa as may be assumed. Thomas A. Hale wrote, "Another [reason for ambivalence towards griots] is an ancient tradition that marks them as a separate people categorized all too simplistically as members of a 'caste', a term that has come under increasing attack as a distortion of the social structure in the region. In the worst case, that difference meant burial for griots in trees rather than in the ground in order to avoid polluting the earth (Conrad and Frank 1995:4-7). Although these traditions are changing, griots and people of griot heritage still find it difficult to marry outside of their social group." This discrimination is now deemed illegal.

Musical instruments used by griots
In addition to being singers and social commentators, griots are often skilled instrumentalists. Their instruments include the kora, the khalam (or xalam), the goje (or n'ko in the Mandinka language), the balafon, the junjung, and the ngoni.

The kora is a long-necked lute-like instrument with 21 strings. The xalam is a variation of the kora, and usually consists of fewer than five strings. Both have gourd bodies that act as resonator. The ngoni is also similar to these two instruments, with five or six strings. The balafon is a wooden xylophone, while the goje is a stringed instrument played with a bow, much like a fiddle.

According to the Encyclopædia Britannica: "West African plucked lutes such as the konting, khalam, and the nkoni (which was noted by Ibn Baṭṭūṭah in 1353) may have originated in ancient Egypt. The khalam is claimed to be the ancestor of the banjo. Another long-necked lute is the ramkie of South Africa."
 
Griots also wrote stories that children enjoyed listening to. These stories were passed down to their children.

Present-day griots
Today, performing is one of the most common functions of a griot. Their range of exposure has widened, and many griots now travel internationally to sing and play the kora or other instruments. 

Bakari Sumano, head of the Association of Bamako Griots in Mali from 1994 to 2003, was an internationally known advocate for the significance of the griot in West African society.

Pape Demba "Paco" Samb, a Senegalese griot of Wolof ancestry, is based in Delaware and performs in the United States. Circa 2013, he performed in charity concerts for SOS Children's Villages in Chicago. As of 2023, Paco leads McDaniel College's Student African Drum Ensemble. His own band is titled the Super Ngewel Emsemble. Concerning the goals of modern-day griot, Paco has stated:If you are griot, you have to flow your history and your family, because we have such a long history. You have to be traditional and share your culture. Any country you go to, you share your family with them.

In popular culture

Film and theater
In the 2018 Marvel Studios movie Black Panther and its 2022  sequel Black Panther: Wakanda Forever, Princess Shuri creates an artificial intelligence assistant named Griot that is voiced by Trevor Noah.
Camille Yarbrough wrote a play called Tales and Tunes of an African American Griot that was performed at La MaMa Experimental Theatre Club in 1973. 
In Guimba the Tyrant (1995), a Malian film directed by Cheick Oumar Sissoko, the village griot is a storyteller and provides comic relief.
I was born as a Djeli (2007) is a French documentary written by Gwenaelle de Kergommeaux and Olivier Janin and directed by Cédric Condom.
Night of the Kings (2020) is an Ivory Coast film directed by Philippe Lacôte which pays tribute to the tradition of the griot.
In the Senegalese short film Borom Sarret (1963), written and directed by Ousmane Sembène and widely considered the first film made by a Black African in Africa, the protagonist gives his earnings to a griot for a momentary escape from the harsh reality of poverty.

Music
 "Griot" is the name of an instrumental track on Jon Hassell and Brian Eno's 1980 album Possible Musics.
"The Griot" is a track written and arranged by Armand Sabal-Lecco on John Patitucci's 1993 album Another World.
Innercity Griots (1993) is the second album by Los Angeles hip hop group Freestyle Fellowship, released through 4th & B'way Records. The group consists of four emcees: Aceyalone, P.E.A.C.E., Mikah 9, and Self Jupiter. They received worldwide acclaim with this second project. Released during the gangsta era of West Coast hip hop, Innercity Griots, along with albums such as The Pharcyde's Bizarre Ride II the Pharcyde and Del tha Funkee Homosapien's I Wish My Brother George Was Here, established an era of alternative hip hop in California.
"Tale of a Griot" is the 15th song on the album Unforeseen Shadows by American hip hop artist Illogic on 1 January 2000.
 "Griot" is the first song on the album Rubber Orchestras by Trinidadian poet and musician Anthony Joseph and The Spasm Band.
From Filthy Tongue of Gods and Griots is the second studio album by New Jersey experimental hip-hop outfit Dälek (2002).
The Griot's Footsteps (Antilles/Verve Records) is an album by cornetist and composer Graham Haynes.
 "The Soul Of The Griot" is a track on the Jamael Dean's 2020 album Ished Tree.

Literature
Alex Haley's 1976 novel Roots references a griot who passed down his family history through the oral tradition. When Haley traces his history, passing from his previous generation through the slave time, back to Africa, he thought there should be griots telling his history and the history of his ancestor, known in the family as "The African", who was captured in the bushes as he was seeking timber to make a talking drum. When Haley arrived in Africa to do research for his book, he believed he had found griots telling his history. Through them, he learned the ancestor's identity: Kunta Kinte. Since he first heard the story from his grandmother and then from his older cousin, he believed that these family members were griots themselves until someone put the story to writing. He later learned that his cousin had died within an hour of his arrival at the village. This story also illustrates the complexities of oral tradition, particularly when approached without expert knowledge. In 1981, it was shown by Donald Wright that the story of Kunta Kinte had been manufactured by a well-wisher. Following the publication of Roots, this story was being told in multiple versions with various embellishments.
In Lawrence Hill's novel The Book of Negroes (2007), the main character Aminata Diallo becomes a jeli.
The Ivorian writer Ahmadou Kourouma's novel Waiting for the Wild Beasts to Vote takes the form of a praise-song by the Sora, the griot, Bingo to the president-dictator of the fictitious République du Golfe. His final novel, Allah is not Obliged, prominently features a griot.
In Paule Marshall's Praisesong for the Widow (1983), the protagonist Avatara (Avey) takes on some characteristics of a griot, particularly in her commitment to passing on her aunt's oral story of the Igbo Landing to her grandchildren. In this story, Africans brought to the Sea Islands to be enslaved turned around and walked back to Africa over the water.
 Malian novelist Massa Makan Diabaté was a descendant and critic of the griot tradition. Though Diabaté argued that griots "no longer exist" in the classic sense, he believed the tradition could be salvaged through literature. His fiction and plays blend traditional Mandinka storytelling and idiom with Western literary forms.

Visual art 

 Beninese artist Pélagie Gbaguidi refers to herself as a contemporary griot, and works to unveil suppressed colonial and post-colonial West African histories with her art.
 Neo-expressionist artist Jean-Michel Basquiat produced a series of paintings in 1984 which prominently feature griots, including 'Flexible', 'Gold Griot', and 'Sabado por la Noche'.

Notable griots

Burkina Faso
 Sotigui Kouyaté
 Dani Kouyate
 Baba Kienou
 Amadou Kienou

Côte d'Ivoire
 Tiken Jah Fakoly (Odienné)

Gambia
 Lamin Saho 
 Foday Musa Suso
 Malamini Jobarteh
 Yan Kuba Saho
 Papa Susso
 Musa Ngum
 Bai Konte
 Amadu Bansang Jobarteh
 Dembo Konte
 Jaliba Kuyateh
 Jali Nyama Suso
 Alhaji Dodou Nying Koliyandeh

Ghana 

 Osei Korankye

Guinea
 Ba Cissoko 
 Djeli Moussa Diawara or Jali Musa Jawara 
 Mory Kante
 N'Faly Kouyate

Guinea Bissau
 Nino Galissa 
 Buli Galissa

Mali
 Abdoulaye Diabaté
 Baba Sissoko
 Ballaké Sissoko 
 Bako Dagnon
 Balla Tounkara
 Cheick Hamala Diabaté
 Djelimady Tounkara
 Habib Koité
 Mamadou Diabaté
 Sara M'Bodji
Sidiki Diabaté
Bassekou Kouyaté
 Toumani Diabaté
 Babani Konkistatu ne

Mauritania
 Dimi Mint Abba
 Malouma
 Noura Mint Seymali

Nigeria
 Dan Maraya Jos 
 Muhamman Shata

Niger
 Etran Finatawa 
 Yacouba Moumouni

Senegal
 Ablaye Cissoko 
 Baaba Maal 
 Nuru Kane 
 Mansour Seck
 Youssou N'Dour 
 Coumba Gawlo Seck 
 Thione Seck 
 Aby Ngana Diop
 Ndèye Diarra Guèye
 Kadialy Kouyate
 Yande Codou Sene

See also

References

Further reading
Charry, Eric S. (2000). Mande Music: Traditional and Modern Music of the Maninka and Mandinka of Western Africa. Chicago Studies in Ethnomusicology; includes audio CD. Chicago: University of Chicago Press.
Hale, Thomas A. (1998). Griots and Griottes: Masters of Words and Music. Bloomington, Indiana: Indiana University Press.
Hoffman, Barbara G. (2001). Griots at War: Conflict, Conciliation and Caste in Mande. Bloomington, Indiana: Indiana University Press.
 
Suso, Foday Musa, Philip Glass, Pharoah Sanders, Matthew Kopka, Iris Brooks (1996). Jali Kunda: Griots of West Africa and Beyond. Ellipsis Arts.

External links
African griot images Catherine Lavender, 2000
Balla Tounkara "Griot" Catherine A. Salmons, 2004
The Maninka and Mandinka Jali/Jeli
The Ancient Craft of Jaliyaa
Keita: The Heritage of the Griot (film notes)
The Griot documentary by Volker Goetze
The Grio News (The Grio is African-American news from NBC)
Jeliya (the art of Jeli, or being a griot)

Oral poets
Occupations in music
Gambian culture
Ghanaian culture
Guinean culture
Ivorian culture
Malian culture
Nigerian culture
Senegalese culture
West Africa
Culture of the African diaspora